Eugene L. Norton (March 26, 1825 – January 21, 1880)  was a Massachusetts politician who served in both branches of the Massachusetts legislature, and as the tenth mayor of  Charlestown, Massachusetts.

See also
 1878 Massachusetts legislature

Notes

1825 births
1880 deaths
Members of the Massachusetts House of Representatives
Massachusetts state senators
Mayors of Charlestown, Massachusetts
Massachusetts city council members
19th-century American politicians
People from Livermore, Maine